Falling From Earth (Arabic: و على الأرض السماﺀ - wa-ala el ard el sama'a) is a 2007 Lebanese film written, produced and directed by Chadi Zeneddine.   The film premiered on December 13, 2007 at the Dubai International Film Festival. It was running for the Muhr award
  
Falling From Earth is Zeneddine's first feature film.

Synopsis

Youssef, a wise fool, lives in the remains of a building, collecting photographs of happy people. Behind each photograph lie millions of implosions of a city wounded by time. Chapter after chapter, they are all still waiting for ... Beirut

Director's Statement
I started shooting the film 3 years ago with a crew of mostly first-timers. The film was interrupted several times and so I would continue shooting every six months for a couple of days; the financial strain was burdening.... and I was falling apart at times.
The project started with the internal fear and heaviness that I had felt due to post-war trauma after I returned to Beirut. It was in no way the physical war that had affected me: I had not lived it. But I could not ignore how mute and destroyed most of us are, despite the effort we put in denying and defying it all through our survival instincts.... but I also could not ignore that I was falling deep in love with the undying city. Some time later, when ‘another’ war broke out, I did remember the SOUND of it... It was haunting me everywhere I went, just like it does to the main character of the film: it has become our shadow and greatest enemy.
Through different chapters that somehow represent several key dates in the perpetual conflict(s), I watch my characters lost and voiceless turning around in circles, still searching or waiting for a ‘no way’ out... indeed a ‘no way’ out, for they are not fallen angels, they are simple humans FALLING FROM EARTH and craving to stay in Beirut, where angels are reborn...

Cast
 Rafik Ali Ahmad
 Carmen Lebbos
 Ammar Shalak
 Naya Salamé
 Yamen Sukkarieh
 Nicole Kamato
 Imad Creidi
 Christine Choueiri
 Pierre Dagher
 Ziad Said
 Amal Ftouni
 Georges Arbid

Production
The film original title was Waiting for ... Beirut.

References

External links
 
 Making Of Videos
 

2007 films
2007 comedy-drama films
2000s Arabic-language films
Lebanese comedy-drama films